The 2006 Christy Ring Cup was the second staging of the Christy Ring Cup, the Gaelic Athletic Association's inter-county hurling tournament for second tier teams. The cup began on 3 June 2006 and ended on 6 August 2006.

Westmeath were the defending champions, however, they availed of their automatic right of promotion to the All-Ireland Championship. Antrim and London contested the cup for the first time.

On 6 August 2006, Antrim won the Christy Ring Cup following a 5-13 to 1-7 defeat of Carlow in the final. This was their first Christy Ring Cup title.

Down's Paul Braniff was the championship's top scorer with 6-26.

Anthony Flaherty came out of retirement at the age of 49 to play for Roscommon against Meath in this competition. Flaherty had not played competitive hurling for eight years ("about 1998") at that time. Flaherty scored a goal against Meath in that game.

Format
Ten counties contested the 2006 competition for the Christy Ring Cup — the prize for the winners of Tier Two of the Guinness All-Ireland Hurling Championship. The inaugural competition involved the current middle rank of hurling counties: 
 Leinster: Carlow, Kildare, Meath, and Wicklow
 Ulster: Antrim and Down
 Connacht: Roscommon and Mayo 
 Munster: Kerry
 England: London

These 10 counties are divided into two groups of five and play in a round-robin format, guaranteeing at least four games each. The eventual group winners and runners-up will qualify for the semi-finals of the Christy Ring Cup. The prize for the winners of the final will be promotion to Tier One of the Hurling Championship to contest the Liam MacCarthy Cup the following year.

The last team in each group will be involved in a relegation play-off with the eventual loser being relegated to the Nicky Rackard Cup.

Group A

Table

Results

Group B

Table

Results

Relegation Final

Relegation final

Knockout stages

Bracket 
Semi-finals

Final

Top scorers

 Paul Branniff (Down) 6-26 (44)
 Johnny McIntosh (Antrim) 5-21 (36)
 Liam Watson (Antrim) 4-19 (31)
 Mikey Conway (Kerry) 4-18 (30)
 Pat Coady (Carlow) 1-26 (29)
 Paddy Richmond (Antrim) 5-10 (25)
 Brian McFall (Antrim) 3-15 (24)

References

Christy Ring Cup
Christy Ring Cup